Paweł Tomczyk (born 4 May 1998) is a Polish professional footballer who plays as a forward for II liga club Polonia Warsaw.

Club career

On 20 July 2017 he was loaned to I liga side Podbeskidzie Bielsko-Biała.

In 2019, he was loaned to Piast Gliwice.

Career statistics

Club

1 Including Polish Super Cup.

Honours
Piast Gliwice
Ekstraklasa: 2018–19

References

1998 births
Footballers from Poznań
Living people
Polish footballers
Poland youth international footballers
Poland under-21 international footballers
Association football forwards
Lech Poznań II players
Lech Poznań players
Podbeskidzie Bielsko-Biała players
Piast Gliwice players
Stal Mielec players
Widzew Łódź players
CS Mioveni players
FC Politehnica Iași (2010) players
Polonia Warsaw players
Ekstraklasa players
I liga players
II liga players
III liga players
Liga I players
Liga II players
Polish expatriate footballers
Expatriate footballers in Romania
Polish expatriate sportspeople in Romania